Walaaeldin Musa Yagoub Muhamed (born 1 January 2000) is a Sudanese footballer who currently plays as a forward for Hay Al-Arab SC.

International career
Yaqoub scored against Mauritania on 17 January 2018, just over two years after scoring his first for his nation against Ethiopia in the 2015 CECAFA Cup.

Career statistics

Club

Notes

International

International goals
Scores and results list Sudan's goal tally first.

References

2000 births
Living people
Sudanese footballers
Sudan international footballers
Sudan under-20 international footballers
Association football forwards
Al-Hilal Club (Omdurman) players
Al-Ahly Shendi players
Sudan Premier League players
2018 African Nations Championship players
Sudan A' international footballers